Hodoul is a surname. Notable people with the surname include:

 Jacques Hodoul (1943–2021), Seychellois judge and politician
 Jean-François Hodoul (1766–1835), French sea captain, corsair, merchant, and plantation owner
 Jean-Louis Hodoul (born 1946), French footballer